Harold "Harry" Keetley (9 April 1903-4Q 1982) was an English footballer who played as a forward.

He was born in Derby one of eleven brothers and one sister. Like eight of his brothers he started off playing for the local amateur Victoria Ironworks team. He and five of his brothers, Arthur, Joe, Tom, Frank and Charlie, went on to play professionally in the Football League.

Playing career
He signed for Doncaster Rovers in August 1924, being transferred to Mansfield Town in June 1927.
Three of his brothers Harry, Tom and Frank also played for Doncaster during their careers. On 20 February 1926 at Belle Vue, Joe, Harry and Frank all played upfront for Doncaster against Wigan Borough, with Harry scoring in the 1–1 draw.

References

1903 births
1982 deaths
Footballers from Derby
English footballers
Matlock Town F.C. players
Doncaster Rovers F.C. players
Mansfield Town F.C. players
Association football forwards